Nemaska Lithium Inc. is a Canadian mining company that seeks to develop a lithium mine, the Whabouchi property, in northern Quebec.

References

External links

Mining companies of Canada